Daniel Frederick Chittenden Soucek  (born April 22, 1969) is a Republican former member of the North Carolina Senate, who represented the State's 45th district.  During his time in office, the 45th District included Alexander, Ashe, Watauga and Wilkes counties (2011 - 2012) and after redistricting, Alleghany, Ashe, Avery, Caldwell and Watauga counties.  On April 8, 2016, Soucek announced his immediate resignation.  In December 2015 he had said he would not seek re-election, citing the desire to spend more time with his family.  He served three terms in the North Carolina Senate.

Background 
Dan Soucek was born in Westfield, New Jersey in 1969.  He graduated from the United States Military Academy in 1991 and was commissioned a Second Lieutenant in Army Aviation.  He was on active duty for over eight years and served in a variety of leadership positions including Company Commander of the International Student Office at Fort Rucker in Alabama.

After resigning his commission in 1999 he moved to Boone, North Carolina to assume the role of Young Life Area Director for Watauga, Ashe, and Avery Counties.  In 2004, he began working as the Asia Regional Director for Operation Christmas Child at Samaritan's Purse.  He was first elected to the North Carolina State Senate in 2010 and won re-election in 2012 and 2014.  He was a primary sponsor of the North Carolina Marriage Amendment, which was adopted by referendum in May 2012 but ruled unconstitutional in October 2014.

His achievements include:
Qualification in the Bell AH-1 Cobra helicopter
Qualification in the Bell UH-1 Iroquois "Huey" helicopter
Airborne and Air Assault qualified
AH-1 Top Gun Award recipient
Iron Aviator triathlon champion

His duties and assignments have allowed him to work with the United States Department of State, general officers and religious leaders from many countries, international business leaders, and governments at all levels from customs officials to Governors, a Prime Minister, and a King.

He has also served as a cross country and track coach at Watauga High School, coached youth soccer and served as an adult and high school Sunday school teacher at Alliance Bible Fellowship.

In February 2013, Dan joined the North Carolina National Guard as a citizen soldier, while continuing to serve in the NC Senate.

Political positions
Conservatism
Received 100% scores from the American Conservative Union in 2011 and 2013.
Received a 98% score from Civitas Action in 2011 and a 94% score in 2013.
Pro-life 
Endorsed by the North Carolina Right to Life organization.
Pro Second Amendment 
Received a 4 star rating from Grassroots North Carolina, an organization created to preserve second amendment rights.
In 2010 the National Rifle Association Political Victory Fund gave Senator Soucek a grade of A.
Pro Business
Endorsed by the National Federation of Independent Business.
Environmental Issues
Received a 3% lifetime rating from the North Carolina League of Conservation Voters in 2013.
Received a rating of 0% from Environment North Carolina in 2011 and 2013 and a 5% rating in 2015.
Endorsements
Grass Roots North Carolina
National Federation of Independent Business
National Rifle Association
State Employees' Association of North Carolina

Committee assignments
2015-2016 Session

References

External links 
 ncleg.net
 votesmart.org

1969 births
Living people
People from Westfield, New Jersey
Republican Party North Carolina state senators
United States Military Academy alumni
21st-century American politicians
Military personnel from New Jersey